Base Aérea de Campo Grande – ALA5  is a base of the Brazilian Air Force, located in Campo Grande, Brazil.

It shares some facilities with Campo Grande International Airport.

History
Campo Grande Air Force Base has its origins on the Aviation Detachment created on 23 January 1934. However, it was on 22 May 1941 that Campo Grande Air Force Base was effectively created by Decree 3,302.

Units
The following units are based at Campo Grande Air Force Base:
 2nd Squadron of the 10th Aviation Group (2°/10°GAv) Pelicano, using the C-105A Amazonas.
 1st Squadron of the 15th Aviation Group (1°/15°GAv) Onça, using the C-105A Amazonas.
 3rd Squadron of the 3rd Aviation Group (3°/3°GAv) Flecha, using the A-29A & B Super Tucano.
 3rd Aviation Battalion of the Brazilian Army (3° BAvEx) Pantera, using HA-1 Fennec, HM-1 Pantera, and HM-3 Cougar.

Access
The base is located 7 km from downtown Campo Grande.

Gallery
This gallery displays aircraft that are or have been based at Campo Grande. The gallery is not comprehensive.

Present aircraft

Retired aircraft

See also
List of Brazilian military bases
Campo Grande International Airport

References

External links

Mato Grosso do Sul
Brazilian Air Force
Brazilian Air Force bases
Buildings and structures in Mato Grosso do Sul
Campo Grande